Lorentzen is a common surname in Denmark and Norway. This article refers to the family related to the Norwegian royal family.

Lorentzen or Bie-Lorentzen is a Norwegian family of Danish origin. Several members have been noted as shipping magnates and industrialists. Among its members are shipowner Erik Finn Lorentzen and industrialist Erling Lorentzen, who was married to Princess Ragnhild of Norway (known as Princess Ragnhild, Mrs. Lorentzen after her marriage), the eldest daughter of King Olav V of Norway.

The family is descended from Hans Zachariassen (died ca. 1643), who was a merchant in Skælskør in Denmark. His son, customs official Hans Hanssøn Skielschøer (1636–1700), settled in Norway, and was the father of merchant in Holmestrand Lorentz Hanssøn (1668–1723). Two branches of the family are descended from his sons, the shipowners Ole Lorentzen (1699–1737) and Jørgen Lorentzen (1709–1752).

A branch of the family uses the double surname Bie-Lorentzen, with or without a hyphen.

People
Hans Ludvig Lorentzen (1840–1905), shipowner in Holmestrand and Brasil
Øivind Lorentzen (1881–1980), Norwegian shipowner
Erik Finn Lorentzen (1921–2010), shipowner
Erling Lorentzen (1923-2021), Norwegian-Brazilian industrialist and founder of Aracruz Celulose
Princess Ragnhild, Mrs. Lorentzen (1930–2012), by marriage
Henriette Bie Lorentzen (1911–2001), by marriage; Norwegian humanist and World War II resistance member

References

 
Danish families
Norwegian families